Paraguay competed at the 1988 Summer Olympics in Seoul, South Korea. Ten competitors, all men, took part in eleven events in five sports.

Competitors
The following is the list of number of competitors in the Games.

Athletics

Key
Note–Ranks given for track events are within the athlete's heat only
Q = Qualified for the next round
q = Qualified for the next round as a fastest loser or, in field events, by position without achieving the qualifying target
NR = National record
N/A = Round not applicable for the event
Bye = Athlete not required to compete in round

Men
Track & road events

Field

Boxing

Fencing

Two fencers represented Paraguay in 1988.

Ranks given are within the group.

Judo

Tennis

See also
Paraguay at the 1987 Pan American Games

References

External links
Official Olympic Reports

Nations at the 1988 Summer Olympics
1988
Olympics